Ali Sadr (also Romanized as ‘Alī Şadr and ‘Alīşadr; also known as Alī Sadd, ‘Alī Sard, and Alsard) is a village in Ali Sadr Rural District, Gol Tappeh District, Kabudarahang County, Hamadan Province, Iran. At the 2006 census, its population was 999, in 249 families.

References 

Populated places in Kabudarahang County